Laurent Dassault is a French billionaire businessman, and the co-managing director of Dassault Group, founded by his grandfather, Marcel Dassault. As of October 2021, his estimated net worth was US$8.6 billion.

Dassault is married, with two children, and lives in Paris, France.

References

Living people
1950s births
French billionaires
French people of Jewish descent
Dassault family
People from Neuilly-sur-Seine
Paris 2 Panthéon-Assas University alumni